is a passenger railway station located in the city of Kawachinagano, Osaka Prefecture, Japan, operated by the private railway operator Nankai Electric Railway. It has the station number "NK70".

Lines

Layout
The station consists of two ground-level opposed side platforms connected by an elevated station building.There is one Y linear lapel line in the south of the station.

Platforms

Adjacent stations

History
Mikkaichichō Station opened on October 21, 1914.

Passenger statistics
In fiscal 2019, the station was used by an average of 14,454 passengers daily.

Surrounding area
 Kawachinagano City Higashi Junior High School
 Kawachinagano City Nankadai Junior High School
 Kawachinagano City Kagada Junior High School

See also
 List of railway stations in Japan

References

External links

  

Railway stations in Japan opened in 1914
Railway stations in Osaka Prefecture
Kawachinagano